"Walk with Me"  is a song by Swedish singers Måns Zelmerlöw and Dotter. The song was released as a digital download on 1 March 2019 through Warner Music Group as the lead single from Zelmerlöw's eighth studio album Time. The song peaked at number 51 on the Swedish Singles Chart. The song was written by Måns Zelmerlöw, Johanna Maria Jansson, Andrew Jackson, Ashley Peter Milton, Daniel Goudie and Rachel Clare Furner.

Live performances
 Melodifestivalen 2019 (2 March 2019)

Lyric video
A lyric video to accompany the release of "Walk with Me" was first released onto YouTube on 28 February 2019 at a total length of two minutes and forty-eight seconds.

Track listing

Charts

Release history

Dami Im version

Zelmerlöw re-recorded the song with Australian singer Dami Im and released the single on 6 February 2020. The duo performed the song live at Eurovision - Australia Decides; The Australian song competition to determine the country's representative for the 2020 Eurovision Song Contest.

Release history

References

2019 songs
2019 singles
2020 singles
Måns Zelmerlöw songs
Dami Im songs
Songs written by Måns Zelmerlöw
Songs written by Dotter (singer)
Dotter songs